Humboldt County Courthouse may refer to:

Humboldt County Courthouse (Iowa), Dakota City, Iowa
Humboldt County Courthouse (Nevada), Winnemucca, Nevada